Roblín is a municipality and village in Prague-West District in the Central Bohemian Region of the Czech Republic. It has about 200 inhabitants.

Administrative parts
The village of Kuchařík is an administrative part of Roblín.

References

Villages in Prague-West District